Chnaunanthus is a genus of scarab beetles in the family Scarabaeidae. There are at least 3 described species in Chnaunanthus.

Species
 Chnaunanthus chapini Saylor, 1937
 Chnaunanthus discolor Burmeister, 1844
 Chnaunanthus flavipennis (Horn, 1867)

References

Further reading

 Arnett, R. H. Jr., M. C. Thomas, P. E. Skelley and J. H. Frank. (eds.). (21 June 2002). American Beetles, Volume II: Polyphaga: Scarabaeoidea through Curculionoidea. CRC Press LLC, Boca Raton, Florida .
 
 Richard E. White. (1983). Peterson Field Guides: Beetles. Houghton Mifflin Company.

Melolonthinae